Paul Erickson may refer to:

 Paul Erickson (screenwriter) (1920–1991)
 Paul Erickson (baseball) (1915–2002)
 Paul Erickson (activist) (born 1962), American conservative political operative
Paul Erickson (trade unionist), incumbent National Secretary of the Australian Labor Party

See also
 Paul Eriksson (born 1991), ice hockey player